Rafael Carlos da Silva (born 11 May 1987) is a Brazilian heavyweight judoka. He became Brazil's first Olympic medalist in the judo heavyweight division (>100 kg), winning a bronze medal in 2012. Silva won the Pan American Judo Championships in 2012–2014 and 2016, and qualified for the 2016 Olympics.

At the 2016 Summer Olympics, he won again the bronze medal in the Men's +100 kg, losing only to Teddy Riner.

In 2020, he won the silver medal in the men's +100 kg event at the 2020 Pan American Judo Championships held in Guadalajara, Mexico.

He represented Brazil at the 2020 Summer Olympics.

He won the silver medal in his event at the 2022 Judo Grand Slam Tel Aviv held in Tel Aviv, Israel.

References

External links

 
 
 
 

1987 births
Judoka at the 2011 Pan American Games
Pan American Games silver medalists for Brazil
Judoka at the 2012 Summer Olympics
Judoka at the 2016 Summer Olympics
Judoka at the 2020 Summer Olympics
Olympic judoka of Brazil
Olympic bronze medalists for Brazil
Living people
Olympic medalists in judo
Sportspeople from Mato Grosso do Sul
Medalists at the 2012 Summer Olympics
Medalists at the 2016 Summer Olympics
Brazilian male judoka
Pan American Games medalists in judo
South American Games gold medalists for Brazil
South American Games medalists in judo
Competitors at the 2010 South American Games
Medalists at the 2011 Pan American Games